Alitya (Alice Dorothy) Wallara Rigney , née Richards, (27 November 1942 – 13 May 2017) was an Australian Aboriginal scholar. She was a Kaurna elder and part of the team that revived the Kaurna language.

Life
Rigney was born on the Aboriginal Mission at Point Pearce. When she completed primary school, her teacher arranged for her to attend Unley High School in Adelaide as the local high schools would not accept Aboriginal children. She returned to Point Pearce following her schooling and training as a nurse, married and raised her family there. She worked at the local kindergarten, then as a School Support Officer at Maitland Area School. She was eventually registered as a teacher, but for Point Pearce only. She then went to Adelaide and was the only Aboriginal student of 400 at the de Lissa Institute, before 1980 Adelaide Kindergarten Teachers College, renamed for Lillian Daphne de Lissa and  now part of the University of South Australia. Once she graduated, she was a teacher at a primary school in the western suburbs of Adelaide. She became the first Aboriginal bureaucrat in the South Australian Department of Education. In the 1980s, she agitated for the creation of what became the Kura Yerlo Aboriginal Centre in Largs Bay and the Kaurna Plains School in Elizabeth. She became the first female Aboriginal principal of a primary school in Australia when she took up the post of principal at Kaurna Plains.

Rigney was awarded a Public Service Medal in 1991.

She was awarded an honorary Ph.D. by the University of South Australia in 1998 in recognition of her pioneering contribution to Aboriginal education.

In 2000 she was appointed a panel member of the S.A. Guardship Board.

Rigney died in Adelaide on 13 May 2017, a day after her husband Lester was buried on their birth country at Point Pearce. Their three children all have roles in education: Lester-Irabinna Rigney is a Professor of Education at UniSA, Eileen Wanganeen is a teacher and education leader and Tracey Ritchie is a principal Aboriginal consultant at the Department of Education and Child Development.
She was posthumously made an Officer of the Order of Australia in the 2018 Queen's Birthday Honours.

References

1942 births
2017 deaths
Australian schoolteachers
Australian headmistresses
Officers of the Order of Australia
Recipients of the Public Service Medal (Australia)
Kaurna
Narungga
Indigenous Australian education
People from South Australia